A heart rate monitor (HRM) is a personal monitoring device that allows one to measure/display heart rate in real time or record the heart rate for later study. It is largely used to gather heart rate data while performing various types of physical exercise. Measuring electrical heart information is referred to as electrocardiography (ECG or EKG).

Medical heart rate monitoring used in hospitals is usually wired and usually multiple sensors are used. Portable medical units are referred to as a Holter monitor. Consumer heart rate monitors are designed for everyday use and do not use wires to connect.

History
Early models consisted of a monitoring box with a set of electrode leads which attached to the chest. The first wireless EKG heart rate monitor was invented in 1977 by Polar Electro as a training aid for the Finnish National Cross Country Ski team. As "intensity training" became a popular concept in athletic circles in the mid-80s, retail sales of wireless personal heart monitors started in 1983.

Technologies 

Modern heart rate monitors commonly use one of two different methods to record heart signals (electrical and optical). Both types of signals can provide the same basic heart rate data, using fully automated algorithms to measure heart rate, such as the Pan-Tompkins algorithm.

ECG (Electrocardiography) sensors measure the bio-potential generated by electrical signals that control the expansion and contraction of heart chambers, typically implemented in medical devices.

PPG (Photoplethysmography) sensors use a light-based technology to measure the blood volume controlled by the heart's pumping action.

Electrical
The electrical monitors consist of two elements: a monitor/transmitter, which is worn on a chest strap, and a receiver. When a heartbeat is detected, a radio signal is transmitted, which the receiver uses to display/determine the current heart rate. This signal can be a simple radio pulse or a unique coded signal from the chest strap (such as Bluetooth, ANT, or other low-power radio links). Newer technology prevents one user's receiver from using signals from other nearby transmitters (known as cross-talk interference) or eavesdropping. Note, the older Polar 5.1 kHz radio transmission technology is usable underwater. Both Bluetooth and Ant+ use the 2.4 GHz radio band, which cannot send signals underwater.

Optical

More recent devices use optics to measure heart rate by shining light from an LED through the skin and measuring how it scatters off blood vessels. In addition to measuring the heart rate, some devices using this technology are able to measure blood oxygen saturation (SpO2). Some recent optical sensors can also transmit data as mentioned above.

Newer devices such as cell phones or watches can be used to display and/or collect the information. Some devices can simultaneously monitor heart rate, oxygen saturation, and other parameters. These may include sensors such as accelerometers, gyroscopes, and GPS to detect speed, location and distance.

In recent years, it has been common for smartwatches to include heart rate monitors, which has greatly increased popularity. Some smartwatches, smart bands and cell phones often use PPG sensors.

Fitness metrics
Garmin, Polar Electro, Suunto, Samsung, Google and Fitbit are vendors selling consumer heart rate products. Most companies use their own proprietary heart rate algorithms.

Accuracy
The newer, wrist based heart rate monitors have achieved almost identical levels of accuracy as their chest strap counterparts with independent tests showing up to 95% accuracy, but sometimes more than 30% error can persist for several minutes. Optical devices can be less accurate when used during vigorous activity, or when used underwater.

Currently, heart rate variability is less available on optical devices. Apple introduced HRV data collection to the Apple Watch devices in 2018.

See also 
Activity tracker
Apple Watch
E-textiles
eHealth
GPS watch
Pedometer

References

External links 

Visualization of ECG recordings using Python program ECG-pyview A simple Python program visualizing raw data produced by chest strap based ECG sportesters. Enables to inspect ECG recordings having lengths up to days. (Open source, non-commercial use, use matplotlib.) A demo video.

Biomedical engineering
Diagnostic cardiology
Exercise equipment
Finnish inventions
Medical monitoring equipment
Physiological instruments